Thomas Hagn (born 28 February 1995) is a German footballer.

Career

On 8 July 2015 Hagn moved to VfB Stuttgart II.

Career statistics

References

External links
 
 

1995 births
Living people
German footballers
FC Bayern Munich footballers
SpVgg Unterhaching players
SpVgg Unterhaching II players
VfB Stuttgart II players
3. Liga players
Regionalliga players
Germany youth international footballers
Association football fullbacks
People from Freising
Sportspeople from Upper Bavaria
Footballers from Bavaria